Hemmat (lit. "Determination") was a weekly newspaper published from Teheran, Iran. Hemmat was the organ of the Workers Unity Party, and was founded in early 1981. Mahmoud Sayrafiezadeh was the editor of Hemmat. Hemmat lacked legal authorization, but its circulation was tolerated by the authorities at the time.

References

1981 establishments in Iran
Defunct newspapers published in Iran
Defunct weekly newspapers
Newspapers published in Tehran
Persian-language newspapers
Publications established in 1981
Socialist newspapers
Publications with year of disestablishment missing